Drumheller-Chinook was a provincial electoral district in Alberta, Canada, mandated to return a single member to the Legislative Assembly of Alberta using the first-past-the-post method of voting from 1997 to 2004.

History
The electoral district was created in the 1996 boundary redistribution from the Drumheller and Chinook electoral districts.

The electoral district would be combined with Lacombe-Stettler to form Drumheller-Stettler in 2003.

Members of the Legislative Assembly (MLAs)

Electoral history

1997 general election

2001 general election

See also
List of Alberta provincial electoral districts
Drumheller, Alberta, town in south-eastern Alberta

References

Further reading

External links
Elections Alberta
The Legislative Assembly of Alberta

Former provincial electoral districts of Alberta
Drumheller